Ramganga railway station is a small railway station in Bareilly district, Uttar Pradesh. Its code is RGB.

Passing trains

References

Railway stations in Bareilly district
Izzatnagar railway division